It Can Happen Here may refer to:
It Can Happen Here: Authoritarian Peril in the Age of Bush, 2007 book by  Joe Conason
It Can Happen Here: White Power and the Rising Threat of Genocide in the US, 2021 book by Alexander Laban Hinton

See also
It Can't Happen Here
Can't Happen Here (disambiguation)
Search Wikipedia for ""